Ghulam Sediq Wardak (born 1942) is an Afghan inventor, credited with 341 inventions, none of which are patented. He is a local hero, despite being only semi-literate, and having no formal higher education. His inventions tend to be practical devices, inspired by needs he perceives in his daily life. His first, made when he was seventeen, was a radio powered by the wearer's bodily electricity.

He has devoted himself to inventing full-time, being supported financially by his four sons.

List of some inventions 
 radio powered by body electricity
 automatic cradle rocker
 solar-powered water pump
 solar-powered car
 electric teakettle with an automatic safety shutoff
 burglar alarm that photographs the intruder
 automatic hand-washing system
 flood warning system
 auto-rotating sprinkler
 oil paint

References

1942 births
Living people
Pashtun people
Afghan inventors